Great Eastern Highway Bypass is a limited-access dual carriageway linking Great Eastern Highway and Roe Highway in Perth, Western Australia. Together with a section of Roe Highway, it bypasses the historical Guildford and Midland localities, through which the original, urban and slower Great Eastern Highway passes.

Route description
Through traffic flows between Great Eastern Highway southwest of the intersection and the bypass to the east; access to the north-eastern section of Great Eastern Highway requires turning off the main route. The bypass proceeds around the northern edge of Perth Airport for  before encountering Kalamunda Road at a traffic light controlled intersection. A further  takes the bypass to Stirling Crescent, a local road providing access to Hazelmere and High Wycombe, and the road ends at Roe Highway,  to the east. Both intersections are traffic light controlled. Southbound, the highway heads towards .

History
Plans for a major highway along a similar alignment date back to Gordon Stephenson and Alistair Hepburn's 1955 "Plan for the Metropolitan Region", which was the precursor of Perth's Metropolitan Region Scheme. The first gazetted edition of the scheme shows it as a controlled access highway, extending west beyond Great Eastern Highway. The route crossed the Swan River and met a proposed north–south highway (now constructed and named Tonkin Highway), and followed the river to Perth's CBD, cutting across the Maylands and Burswood peninsulas.  Such a route was still planned for in the 1970s and 1980s. The eastern section, corresponding to the current Great Eastern Highway Bypass, was constructed in the late 1980s, and was known as the Redcliffe–Bushmead Highway during construction. Great Eastern Highway Bypass was opened on 14 May 1988, after 21 months of construction, and at a cost of $10 million. The western continuation was not developed, and the route was not included in subsequent planning documents in the 1990s.

Intersections
The entire highway is in the City of Swan local government area, part of the Perth Metropolitan Region.

See also

References

Further reading

External links

Main Roads WA

Highways and freeways in Perth, Western Australia
Hazelmere, Western Australia
Bypasses in Australia